Asenie is one of the eight Akan major clans.

Totem
The totem of the Asenie people is the bat

Major towns
The major towns of the Asenie include Amakom, Wenchi etc.

References

Akan people